John Henry Devitt (February 1, 1851 – June 14, 1940) was an Ontario political figure. He represented Durham West in the Legislative Assembly of Ontario from 1905 to 1919 as a Conservative member.

Biography
He was born in Cartwright Township, Canada West, the son of Thomas Devitt and Jane McKee. He was a member of the township council from 1882 to 1890, serving as reeve in 1896 and country warden in 1899. He married Elizabeth Watson on June 1, 1881. He was a prominent member in the Orange Order. He died in 1940 and was buried at St. John's Cemetery in Blackstock.

References

External links 
Cartwright Revisited, 1983, D Van Camp

1855 births
1940 deaths
Progressive Conservative Party of Ontario MPPs